The following is the discography of English singer-songwriter Bryan Ferry. For his discography as a member of Roxy Music, see Roxy Music discography.

Albums

Studio albums

Live albums

Remix albums

Compilation albums

Video albums

EPs

Singles

Other appearances

Studio

Guest

Notes

References

Discography
Pop music discographies
Discographies of British artists